Dots and Loops is the fifth studio album by English-French rock band Stereolab. It was released on 22 September 1997 and was issued by Duophonic Records and Elektra Records. The band co-produced the album with John McEntire and Andi Toma, and recording took place at their respective studios in Chicago and Düsseldorf. It was their first album to be recorded straight to Digital Audio Tape and produced with Pro Tools. The album explores jazz and electronic sounds, and is influenced by bossa nova and 1960s pop music. Its lyrics address matters such as consumerism, the "spectacle", materialism, and human interaction.

Dots and Loops reached number 19 on the UK Albums Chart, as well as number 111 on the Billboard 200 chart in the United States. The track "Miss Modular" was issued as a single and as an EP, and peaked at number 60 on the UK Singles Chart. Several music critics have praised Dots and Loops for its blend of accessible music with experimental and avant-garde sounds, and some have considered it to be one of the band's finest works and one of the first produced with a Digital Audio Workstation. The album was reissued in 2019 with bonus material.

Background and recording
Seven of the ten tracks on Dots and Loops were recorded by Stereolab in March 1997 at the Chicago studio Idful Music Corporation with John McEntire, who also produced and mixed the tracks with the band. The remaining three tracks – "The Flower Called Nowhere", "Prisoner of Mars", and "Contronatura" – were recorded the following month at Academy of St. Martin in the Street in Düsseldorf, this time with co-production, co-mixing, and engineering duties overseen by Andi Toma. Additional engineering was undertaken by Max Stamm and Toma's Mouse on Mars bandmate Jan St. Werner. Stereolab recorded the song "I Feel the Air (Of Another Planet)" for the album, but it was not mixed in time for the mastering process and instead appeared on the band's 2000 EP The First of the Microbe Hunters.

The Dots and Loops sessions marked the first time Stereolab recorded straight to Digital Audio Tape, a process the band found enjoyable. McEntire also introduced the band to Pro Tools. "Digital audio recording seemed like a child’s toy," said Tim Gane. "Making lots of little loops of the bass, guitar and the drum parts, not having to play everything through from beginning to end, plopping things in where you wanted them and moving things around to see how it sounded. We loved it!" The extra track "Bonus Beats" from the album's 2019 expanded edition also sees the band's drummer Andy Ramsay experimenting with a drum machine.

The album's title references Norman McLaren's 1940 animated short films Dots and Loops.

Musical style
According to AllMusic critic Stephen Thomas Erlewine, Dots and Loops is primarily influenced by bossa nova and 1960s pop music. Barney Hoskyns of Rolling Stone found that the album continued Stereolab's progression towards a lighter sound that he termed "avant-easy listening", while Michelle Goldberg of Metro referred to it as the band's "lounge apotheosis". Treble writer Jeff Terich noted the "more lush" quality of the music on Dots and Loops compared to Stereolab's previous work, characterising it as "gorgeously orchestrated" art pop.

Erlewine observed that Stereolab "concentrated on layered compositions" on Dots and Loops. He described the band's interplay on the album as edging "closer to jazz than rock, exploring all of the possibilities of any melodic phrase." Alex Hudson of Exclaim! wrote that "if there's any krautrock to be found here, it's not the motorik pulse of Neu! but the freaky, funky jazz exploration of Can." Pitchforks Eric Harvey said that Dots and Loops exemplified the "recombinant pop" aesthetic that arose in the 1990s, which saw rock musicians embracing the "looped, sampled and collaged" production techniques of electronic and hip hop music. The album frequently makes use of  time signatures, including on the tracks "Diagonals", "Rainbo Conversation", and "Parsec".

Themes
According to Sophie Kemp of Vice, Dots and Loops is informed by Stereolab's "ideology" of "tackling both despotism and exploring the artistic boundaries of living by capitalism", with the album seeing the band's chief lyricist Lætitia Sadier commenting on "different fears about the world in every track". Kemp found that these themes are complemented by the album's "sprightly spirit", interpreting the "serene" quality of the music as "a very topical critique on the numbness of society and how the more comfortable we get with capitalism, the more jaded we become to pain and suffering."

Eric Harvey suggested that the song "Brakhage" concerns both "consumerist desire" and "the sheer amount of studio gadgets required to make the album itself." Stewart Mason of AllMusic said that the lyrics of "Miss Modular" "sound influenced by the Situationist theory of the 'spectacle'". "The Flower Called Nowhere" is about "harbor-bound boats never desiring to 'break free and sail'". "Diagonals" discusses "the materialistic escapism of the bourgeois European holiday." "Rainbo Conversation" is about revolution beginning "in the bedroom", where "nothing is more political than the personal". "Refractions in the Plastic Pulse" regards "human interaction amid the spectacle". "Contronatura" is "a dialogue between friends" which "calls for a quiet rebellion against nature […] and our baser natures", and later shifts "to a political tract that captures the album's mystifying artificial/natural spirit in its final moments".

Composition
Dots and Loops opens with "Brakhage", which in its first seconds "sputter[s] to life like it's being tuned in from outer space on a vintage receiver", and is afterwards anchored by a two-chord keyboard line and "skittering drum and vibraphone loops". "Miss Modular" is built on a two-chord pattern augmented by brass arranged by Sean O'Hagan, and finds Tim Gane using the guitar "as a percussive element" to complement Andy Ramsay's drumming. The following track, "The Flower Called Nowhere", is a "waltz" that "weds a John Barry harpsichord riff with a cosmic MOR melody." Gane said that the song took inspiration from composer Krzysztof Komeda and incorporates a choral chant from Komeda's score for the 1967 film The Fearless Vampire Killers. "Diagonals" pairs a marimba loop with a "mutant-funk jazz drum loop" sampled from Amon Düül II's "I Can't Wait". "Prisoner of Mars", the album's fifth track, has been described as "an Astrud Gilberto-style dreamy drift of a ditty which sporadically yanks up its swooshing skirt of sumptuous melody to reveal ultra-spartan techno-rhumba undercarriage."

"Refractions in the Plastic Pulse" is a four-part 17-minute track that begins with "all murky vibes, flat Farfisa pads, bossa-nova guitar and Brian Wilson bass", then "mutat[es] into snarled-up space-rock and metallic junglism – then back to its jaunty original refrain." "Parsec" is a "samba-flavored drum'n'bass track with a peaceful dub break." The ninth track, "Ticker-Tape of the Unconscious", opens with a sample of "Divino, Maravilhoso" by Gal Costa and "lays trancey vibes and brass over Stevie Wonder funk". Album closer "Contronatura" starts as "a chiming, intimate plaint through a thicket of massed, dank nature samples", and after "a two minute interlude of organic squishiness", progresses into "a thumping, gelatinous march rhythm", marking the album's "most danceable" sequence.

Release
Dots and Loops was released on 22 September 1997 in the United Kingdom by Duophonic Records, peaking at number 19 on the UK Albums Chart. In the United States, it was released on 23 September 1997 by Elektra Records, becoming Stereolab's first entry on the Billboard 200 chart, where it peaked at number 111; by August 1999, it had sold over 75,000 copies in the country.

Prior to the album's release, "Miss Modular" was issued on 1 September 1997 as a single (on 7" vinyl) and as an EP (on CD and 12" vinyl), reaching number 60 on the UK Singles Chart. The song's music video was directed and produced by Nick Abrahams and Mikey Tomkins. The track "Parsec" was later used in commercials for the then-newly launched Volkswagen New Beetle. A remastered and expanded edition of Dots and Loops, featuring a second disc containing demos and instrumental mixes of the album's songs, was released on 13 September 2019 by Duophonic and Warp as part of Stereolab's back catalogue reissue campaign.

Critical reception and legacy

Reviewing Dots and Loops in 1997, The Guardians Kathy Sweeney considered the album a successful move towards a more accessible and "pop-conscious" sound, with Stereolab's "avant-garde tendencies and atonal drone of old supplanted by breezy harmonies and, wait for it, tunes." Tom Sinclair of Entertainment Weekly said that it "finds them at the top of their game, successfully brokering the seeming shotgun marriage of easy listening and acute intellect." NME writer Stephen Dalton stated that the band "have never sounded so comfortable in a pop setting than on Dots and Loops", which he deemed "both more accessible and more adventurous" than their previous album Emperor Tomato Ketchup. Terri Sutton of Spin praised the music as Stereolab's "most audacious" to date, and Los Angeles Times critic Lorraine Ali commented that the band "continues to revitalize Muzak for the '90s." In The Village Voice, Robert Christgau was more critical, finding that "the tunes fall off and the wacky smarts lose the charm of surprise." At the end of 1997, Dots and Loops was named among the best albums of the year by several publications, including Melody Maker, Mojo, NME, and The Wire. It also placed at number 28 in The Village Voices Pazz & Jop critics' poll.

In his retrospective review of the album for Pitchfork, Eric Harvey praised Dots and Loops as Stereolab's "peak", finding them "embracing the bleeding edge of digital studio technology" and creating "a work both of its moment and […] that seems to hover outside everything else." He also considered it to be one of the first albums produced with a digital audio workstation. Louis Pattison of Uncut described it as being "a touch less immediate" than Emperor Tomato Ketchup, remarking on its "laid-back and loungier" mood, while noting that it captured Stereolab in their "imperial phase". Exclaim!s I. Khider cited Dots and Loops as a "definitive" post-rock recording. Writing for the same magazine, Alex Hudson commended the band for "deliver[ing] some of their most accessible pop without sacrificing any of their experimental impulses." In Vice, Sophie Kemp called Dots and Loops "a major milestone in the world of experimental pop, and within Stereolab's expansive discography", deeming it the band's "most sonically accessible and politically important record."

Track listing

Personnel
Credits are adapted from the album's liner notes.

Stereolab
 Tim Gane, Lætitia Sadier, Mary Hansen, Richard Harrison, Morgane Lhote, and Andy Ramsay – vocals, Farfisa organ, analogue synthesizers "and other electronic devices (for sound generating and filtering)", Rhodes piano, piano, clavinet, electric guitar, nylon string acoustic guitar, bass, drums, percussion, drum machines ("beatbox" and "electronic percussion")

Additional musicians

 John McEntire – analogue synthesizer, electronics, percussion, vibraphone, marimba (tracks 1, 2, 4, 6–9)
 Sean O'Hagan – piano, Rhodes piano, Farfisa organ (1, 2, 4, 6–9), brass arrangements, string arrangements
 Douglas McCombs – acoustic bass (1)
 Jan St. Werner – electronics, "insect horns" (3, 5, 10)
 Andi Toma – electronics, electronic percussion (3, 5, 10)
 Xavier "Fischfinger" Fischer – piano (3)
 Jeb Bishop, Dave Max Crawford, Paul Mertens, and Ross Reed – brass section
 Andy Robinson – brass arrangements
 Poppy Branders, Maureen Loughnane, Rebecca McFaul, and Shelley Weiss – string section
 Marcus Holdaway – string arrangements

Production

 Stereolab (credited as "The Groop") – production, mixing
 John McEntire – production, recording, mixing (1, 2, 4, 6–9 at Idful Music Corporation, Chicago)
 Nick Webb – mastering (Abbey Road Studios, London)
 Andi Toma – production, recording, mixing (3, 5, 10 at Academy of St. Martin in the Street, Düsseldorf)
 Jan St. Werner – electronics engineering (3, 5, 10)
 Max Stamm – additional engineering (3, 5, 10)

Charts

References

External links
 Dots and Loops at official Stereolab website
 
 

1997 albums
Stereolab albums
Albums produced by John McEntire
Elektra Records albums